Bonnier is a surname. Notable people with the surname include:

 Åke Bonnier (born 1957), Swedish bishop in the Diocese of Skara
 Antoine Bonnier d'Alco (1750–1790), French diplomat during the French Revolution
 Céline Bonnier (born 1965), Canadian actress
 Eva Bonnier (1855–1907), Swedish painter
 Fernand Bonnier de La Chapelle (1922–1942), member of the French resistance
 Gaëtan Bonnier (1857-1944), French general
 Gaston Bonnier (1853–1922), French botanist and plant ecologist
 Joakim Bonnier (1930–1972), Swedish racing driver
 Jonas Bonnier (born 1957), Swedish novelist
 Joseph-Arsène Bonnier (1879–1962), Canadian politician
 Lukas Bonnier (1922–2006), Swedish publisher
 Valérie Bonnier, French actress and novelist

See also
Bonnier family